The Franchi LF57 is an Italian pressed-metal submachine gun. A small number were made for the Italian Navy in the 1960s, and approximately two hundred were ordered by the army for the Target Acquisition Group of the 3rd Missile Brigade (GRACO), but few others ordered it. The LF57 uses a recessed bolt head similar to the Beretta Model 12's as a method of reducing the weapon's length, although on the LF57 the bolt's mass is carried above the barrel rather than around it. This allows manufacture to be simplified to a degree. Most parts are made of stampings and pressings, and the two sides of the gun are one piece each, joined by a long seam. Dismantling the weapon is very simple, such as the barrel, which is held on by one single barrel nut. The tubular butt folds to the right side of the receiver, and the pistol grip is made entirely of steel. The sights are simple fixtures on the top of the barrel.

Users

 
Anyanya
 
  (formerly Zaire)
 
 Front for Congolese National Liberation

See also
 Walther MP
 List of Italian submachine guns
 List of firearms

References

9mm Parabellum submachine guns
Military equipment introduced in the 1950s